Moore House, also known as the James Handy and Mary Hunter Moore House, is a historic home located at Charleston, Mississippi County, Missouri.  It was built in 1899–1900, and is a -story, Colonial Revival style red brick dwelling.  It measures approximately 65 feet by 47 feet and is topped by a hipped roof with gables.  The front facade features a columned and balustraded veranda, with pedimented entry.  The building houses the Mississippi County Historical Society.

It was added to the National Register of Historic Places in 1980.

References

External links
Mississippi County Historical Society

History museums in Missouri
Houses on the National Register of Historic Places in Missouri
Colonial Revival architecture in Missouri
Houses completed in 1900
Buildings and structures in Mississippi County, Missouri
National Register of Historic Places in Mississippi County, Missouri